Kheha is a BTS Skytrain station, on the Sukhumvit Line in Samut Prakan, Thailand.

Kheha is the eastern terminus of the Sukhumvit Line. It opened on 6 December 2018 as part of the 13-km eastern extension. Rides on the extension were free until 16 April 2019.

References

See also
 Bangkok Skytrain

BTS Skytrain stations
Railway stations opened in 2018